Pfeifferinella is a genus of parasitic alveolates in the phylum Apicomplexa. This genus has been poorly studied and little is known about it. Species in this genus infect marine priapulid worms and terrestrial and freshwater gastropods.

History

This genus was created by Wasielewski in 1904.

Taxonomy

The type species is Pfeifferinella ellipsoides.

Six species are currently recognised in this genus.

Description

The majority of species have developmental stages undergo merogony, gamogony and sporogony within the digestive gland of gastropod host. The oocysts are passed in the faeces.

The oocysts lack sporocysts. Each oocyst have 8-14 free sporozoites. A large oocyst residuum is present. The micropyle tends to be large.

References

Conoidasida
Apicomplexa genera